Major–General  Hugh Clement Sutton   (20 January 1867 – 15 April 1928) was a General in the British Army, Deputy Assistant Director of Railways in South Africa between 1900 and 1902 and Lieutenant-Governor and Secretary of Royal Chelsea Hospital between 1923 and 1928.

Early life
Sutton was the son of Henry George Sutton, sixth son of Sir Richard Sutton, 2nd Baronet, by his marriage to Matilda Harriet Heneage, a daughter of George Heneage Walker-Heneage MP and Henrietta Vivian. He was educated at Eton and the Royal Military College, Sandhurst.

Military career
Sutton was commissioned a second lieutenant in the Coldstream Guards on 14 September 1887, promoted to lieutenant on 4 September 1890, and to captain on 1 December 1897. He served in South Africa during the Second Boer War between 1899 and 1902. As Adjutant of the Coldstream Guards, he served in the Orange Free State from February to May 1900, taking parts in the actions at Belmont, Enslin, and Modder River (November 1899), Magersfontein (December 1899), Paardeberg (February 1900), Poplar Grove and Driefontein (March 1900). He was Deputy Assistant Director of Railways in Johannesburg from July 1900 to 1902. For his service he was mentioned in despatches, received the Queen's and King's South Africa medals with seven clasps, and a brevet promotion to major dated 29 November 1900. The war ended in June 1902, and from November that year he was assistant military secretary and aide-de-camp to Sir Henry Settle, Commander-in-Chief in the Cape Colony. He stayed in South Africa to serve as a Deputy Assistant Adjutant General in the Cape Colony between 1903 and 1906.

Commanding 1st Battalion Coldstream Guards between 1910 and 1913. During the First World War: Hugh was serving as Assistant Adjutant-General in War Office between 1913 and 1916 and as a Deputy Adjutant & Quartermaster-General (DA and QMG) in British Expeditionary Force (BEF) between 1916 and 1917.

Awards and recognitions
He was invested as a Companion, Order of the Bath (C.B.) in 1916 and as a Companion, Order of St Michael and St George (C.M.G.) in 1919.

Family
He married Mabel Ida Munro, daughter of Sir Campbell Munro of Lindertis, 3rd Baronet, and Lady Henrietta Maria Munro (née Drummond), on 25 July 1891.
Hugh and Mabel had one son:
Nigel Eustace Philip Sutton (29 March 1896 – 18 March 1956)
He married Alexandra Mary Elizabeth Wood, daughter of Charles Wood, 2nd Viscount Halifax of Monk Bretton, on 15 September 1898, they had three daughters:
Margaret Agnes Sutton (born 26 September 1899, d. 1993), m. 1937, John Julian Chetwynd (1906-1966), son of Godfrey Chetwynd, 8th Viscount Chetwynd.
Mary Frances Sutton (12 June 1904 – 2 April 1975).
Elizabeth Mary Sutton (born 17 April 1910), m. (1) 1931 (div. 1936), Sir (Ronald) Mark Cunliffe-Turner; m. (2) 1936 (div. 1976), John Tindall-Lister (1907-1994), son of Sir William Tindall Lister.

References

1867 births
People educated at Eton College
Wood family
Coldstream Guards officers
British Army generals
Graduates of the Royal Military College, Sandhurst
1928 deaths
Companions of the Order of the Bath
Companions of the Order of St Michael and St George